Leon Helena Sylvain Nolens (born 11 April 1947 in Bree), pseudonym Leonard Nolens, is a Belgian poet and diary writer.  He graduated from the Hoger Instituut voor Vertalers en Tolken in Antwerp.

Nolens lives and works in Antwerp. Themes in his writings include love and ways to escape one's identity.

Bibliography

 1969 - Orpheushanden (poetry)
 1973 - De muzeale minnaar (poetry)
 1975 - Twee vormen van zwijgen (poetry)
 1977 - Incantatie (poetry)
 1979 - Alle tijd van de wereld (poetry)
 1981 - Hommage (poetry)
 1983 - Vertigo (poetry)
 1986 - De gedroomde figuur (poetry)
 1988 - Geboortebewijs (poetry)
 1989 - Stukken van mensen (diary)
 1990 - Liefdes verklaringen (poetry)
 1991 - Hart tegen hart (poetry)
 1992 - Tweedracht (poetry)
 1993 - Blijvend vertrek (diary)
 1994 - Honing en as (poetry)
 1995 - De vrek van Missenburg (diary)
 1996 - En verdwijn met mate (poetry)
 1997 - De liefdesgedichten (poetry)
 1998 - Een lastig portret (diary)
 1999 - Voorbijganger (poetry)
 2001 - Manieren van leven (poetry)
 2003 - Derwisj (poetry)
 2004 - Bres" met etsen van Dan Van Severen (a livre de peintre, Ergo Pers Gent)
 2004 - Laat alle deuren op een kier (verzamelde gedichten) (poetry)
 2005 - Een dichter in Antwerpen (poetry)
 2007 - Een fractie van een kus (poetry)
 2007 - Bres (poetry)
 2008 - Woestijnkunde (poetry)
 2009 - Dagboek van een dichter 1979-2007 (combined diaries)
 2011 - Zeg aan de kinderen dat wij niet deugen (poetry)

Awards
 1974 - Prijs van het beste literaire debuut for De muzeale minnaar
 1976 - Arkprijs van het Vrije Woord for Twee vormen van zwijgen
 1976 - Poëzieprijs van de provincie Antwerpen for Twee vormen van zwijgen
 1980 - Hugues C. Pernath-prijs for Alle tijd van de wereld
 1980 - Poëzieprijs van de provincie Limburg for Alle tijd van de wereld
 1984 - Tweejaarlijkse poëzieprijs van De Vlaamse Gids for Vertigo
 1991 - Jan Campert prijs for Liefdesverklaringen
 1997 - Constantijn Huygensprijs for his entire oeuvre
 2002 - Gedichtendagprijzen for Hostie out of Manieren van leven
 2007 - Karel van de Woestijneprijs for poetry of Sint-Martens-Latem
 2008 - VSB Poetry Prize for Bres
 2012 - Prijs der Nederlandse Letteren

See also
 Flemish literature

References

Sources
 Leonard Nolens (in Dutch)
 Willem M. Roggeman, Leonard Nolens In: Beroepsgeheim 5 (1986)

External links

 Leonard Nolens (poet) - Belgium - Poetry International

1947 births
Flemish writers
Living people
Constantijn Huygens Prize winners
Ark Prize of the Free Word winners
Prijs der Nederlandse Letteren winners

International Writing Program alumni